Lake City Army Ammunition Plant (LCAAP) is a  U.S. government-owned, contractor-operated facility in northeastern Independence, Missouri, that was established by Remington Arms in 1941 to manufacture and test small caliber ammunition for the U.S. Army. The facility has remained in continuous operation except for one 5-year period following World War II. As of July 2007, the plant produced nearly 1.4 billion rounds of ammunition per year.  In addition, Lake City performs small caliber ammunition stockpile reliability testing and has ammunition and weapon testing responsibilities as the NATO National and Regional Test Center. LCAAP is the single largest producer of small arms ammunition for the United States Armed Forces.

Capabilities
The manufacturing capabilities of the plant include:  Small arms cartridges; components such as percussion and electric primer; pyrotechnics; and small caliber ammunition (5.56 mm; 7.62 mm; .50 caliber; and 20 mm). The plant also performs reliability testing on small caliber ammunition (5.56 mm; 7.62 mm; 9 mm, .22 caliber; .45 caliber; and .50 caliber) and demilitarization and disposal of small caliber ammunition and explosives.

History
LCAAP was established in December 1940 as the Lake City Arsenal, with production beginning in 1941. It was the first of 12 small arms plants run by the Army. The plant was built by Remington with assistance from DuPont.

Remington Arms operated the plant from its inception until 1985, when operations were taken over by the Olin Corporation. From April 2001, it was operated by Alliant Techsystems (ATK), later known as Orbital ATK after a 2015 merger between Orbital Sciences Corporation and parts of Alliant Techsystems. Orbital ATK was acquired by Northrop Grumman in 2018 and is now known as Northrop Grumman Innovation Systems. Starting in October 2020, Winchester Ammunition was selected by the US Army to operate and manage the Lake City Plant.

An accidental explosion in a primer manufacturing facility at the plant in April 2017 killed one worker and injured four others.

Facilities

Hazardous waste contamination
Historically, LCAAP waste treatment and disposal occurred on-site and relied on unlined lagoons, landfills, and burn pits. The plant generated large quantities of potentially hazardous wastes and hazardous substances, including solvents, oils, greases, explosives, radionuclides, perchlorates, and heavy metals. As a result of the extensive contamination, the site was added to the United States Environmental Protection Agency's National Priorities List in 1987, and it remains a Superfund site.

References

Information compiled from https://www.jmc.army.mil/thumbnails/pdfs/2020%20Lake%20City%20AAP%20Fact%20Sheet%2009112020.PDF

External links

. Details LCAAP production.
Joint Munitions Command website

Ammunition manufacturers
Buildings and structures in Independence, Missouri
Companies based in Independence, Missouri
Historic American Engineering Record in Missouri
Military installations in Missouri
Military Superfund sites
Olin Corporation
United States Army arsenals
United States Army arsenals during World War II
Superfund sites in Missouri
Alliant Techsystems